David Bornstein is a journalist and author who specializes in writing about social innovation, using a style called solutions journalism. He has written three books on social entrepreneurship. He writes for the Fixes blog for The New York Times website, and is one of the co-founders of the Solutions Journalism Network.

Personal
Bornstein was raised in Montreal, Quebec, Canada, and now lives in New York City.

Family
Bornstein is married, and he and his wife have one child, a son.

Awards 
He was awarded the 2007 Human Security Award for work in social entrepreneurship on October 25, 2007, which is given annually by the Coalition Advocating Human Security, a program of the University of California, Irvine. He also received the 2008 Leadership in Social Entrepreneurship Award from Duke University's Fuqua School of Business.  He is additionally a co-recipient of the 2014 Vision Award, presented by Middlebury College's Center for Social Entrepreneurship.

Books
 Social Entrepreneurship: What Everyone Needs to Know, co-authored with Susan Davis
 How to Change the World: Social Entrepreneurs and the Power of New Ideas
 The Price of a Dream: The Story of the Grameen Bank

External links
 How to Change the World: Social Entrepreneurs and the Power of New Ideas, Interview of David Bornstein by Denis Failly
 Dowser.org

References

Year of birth missing (living people)
Living people
American business writers